Sigurbergur Sveinsson (born 12 August 1987) is an Icelandic handball player who currently plays for ÍBV Vestmannaeyjar. He was a member of the Icelandic national team roster for the 2011 World Men's Handball Championship and is again a part of the team for the 2015 World Men's Handball Championship.

References

External links
 Scoresway profile

1987 births
Icelandic male handball players
Living people
People from Hafnarfjörður
Haukar men's handball players